Sri Kurmam also known as Srikurmu or Srikurmais a village near Srikakulam, Andhra Pradesh, India. Srikurmam village is situated at a distance of 14.5 km to the South-east of Srikakulam town. It is in the Gara mandal of Srikakulam district. The village was named after the Srikurmam temple dedicated to Kurma avatar of the Hindu god Vishnu , which was re-established by Eastern Ganga Dynasty King Anantavarman Chodaganga Deva.

Geography 
Sri Kurmam is located at a latitude of 18° 16' N, a longitude of 84° 1' E and an altitude of 17 meters (59 feet).
This location puts the temple about 3 km from the Bay of Bengal.

Sri Kurmam Temple 

Sri Kurmam (holy tortoise) is a famous place of pilgrimage and the temple here is unique of its kind in the entire India. The temple is noted for its architectural beauty and contains many inscriptions ranging from the Eleventh Century A.D. to the Nineteenth Century A.D. According to inscriptions in the temple dated 1281 AD, the holy place of Kürmakshetra was re-established by Ramanujacharya under the influence of Anantavarman Chodaganga Deva of Kalinga.Eastern ganga king Anangabhima Deva built it's pradakshina mandapa.Later the temple came under the jurisdiction of the king of Suryavanshi Gajapatis of orissa. The inscriptions throw light on the dynasties which held sway over this region. The temple is dedicated to Sri Kurmanatha, the second avatar of Vishnu, Kurma Avatar.
Dolotsavam is the important festival and more than 20,000 pilgrims congregate on this occasion.

Pilgrim attractions
 Ancient temple constructed between 9th and 11th Centuries in its pristine form.
 The Trinity of Madhukeswara, Someswara and Bheemeswara Temples.
 The Vishnu lingam is formed by the trunk of Madhuca tree with a naturally carved face.
 Architecture grandeur of red stone sculpture.
 Located on the banks of beautiful river Vamsadhara.
There is also a Turtle sanctuary nearby the temple pond

References 

Villages in Srikakulam district
Hindu pilgrimage sites in India
Uttarandhra